The Fossil room II is one of two paleontological display rooms in Teylers Museum. The Fossil room II was built in 1885 as an extension of the first Fossil room I, under the direction of the architect Ad van der Steur Jr.

History
The Teylers Museum was originally opened in 1784 as a museum of science and arts. During the course of the next few decades the number of natural history objects grew, and under J.G.S. van Breda the Paleontological collection grew with the purchase of various collections based on his in-depth knowledge and personal network. Tiberius Winkler began the task of cataloguing, and was thus able to sort the collection into more or less important objects, and to display these, the idea of a new museum slowly gained ground with the directors.

References

Further reading 
Teyler 1778-1978. Studies en bijdragen over Teylers Stichting naar aanleiding van het tweede eeuwfeest, Haarlem & Antwerp, 1978.

External links 
 Teylers Museum collection database online (in Dutch)

Teylers Museum
Paleontological research institutes
Rijksmonuments in Haarlem
History of paleontology
Paleontology in the Netherlands
18th-century architecture in the Netherlands